Dewas Assembly constituency is one of the 230 Vidhan Sabha (Legislative Assembly) constituencies of Madhya Pradesh state in central India. It is a segment of Dewas (Lok Sabha constituency).

Members of Vidhan Sabha
 1957: Anant Sadashiv Patwardhan, Indian National Congress
 1962: Bapulal Kishan, Indian National Congress 
 1967: Hatesingh, Indian National Congress 
 1972: Dhirajsingh Mohansingh, Indian National Congress 
 1977: Shankar Kannungo, Janata Party
 1980: Chandra Prabash Shekhar, Indian National Congress (I) 
 1985: Chandra Prabash Shekhar, Indian National Congress 
 1990: Tukoji Rao Pawar, Bharatiya Janata Party
 1993: Tukoji Rao Pawar, Bharatiya Janata Party
 1998: Tukoji Rao Pawar, Bharatiya Janata Party
 2003: Tukoji Rao Pawar, Bharatiya Janata Party
 2008: Tukoji Rao Pawar, Bharatiya Janata Party
 2013: Tukoji Rao Pawar (BJP). 
 2015 bypoll: Gayatri Raje Pawar, Bharatiya Janata Party

Election Results

1962 Vidhan Sabha
 Bapulal (INC) : 10,708 votes  
 Nand Ram (Jana Sangh) : 5,695

2018 Vidhan Sabha
  Gayatri Raje Pawar (BJP) : 103,456 votes  
 Thakur Jaysingh (INC) : 75,469 
In December 2018, one news outlet erroneously reported that sitting MLA Gayatri Devi had lost. She was trailing for a long time but managed to turn the tide.

See also
 Dewas
 Dewas (Lok Sabha constituency)

References

Dewas district
Assembly constituencies of Madhya Pradesh